Hermenegildo del Rosso (born May 1909, date of death unknown) was an Argentine middle-distance runner. He competed in the men's 800 metres at the 1932 Summer Olympics.

References

External links

1909 births
Year of death missing
Athletes (track and field) at the 1932 Summer Olympics
Argentine male middle-distance runners
Olympic athletes of Argentina